A list of songs recorded by British rock band Cream.

List

Notes

References

Cream (band)
Cream